Khambarabad may refer to:
 Khambarabad, Galikash
 Khambarabad, Kalaleh
 Khambarabad, Torkaman